Mats Anders Lindgren (born 1 October 1974) is a Swedish former professional ice hockey forward.  He was selected in the first round of the 1993 NHL Entry Draft, 15th overall, by the Winnipeg Jets, although he never had the opportunity to play for them.

Despite versatility and a good on-ice work ethic, Lindgren never lived up to the offensive potential that Winnipeg had seen when they drafted him, scoring only thirteen goals in his best NHL season.  In fact, in 387 games with the Edmonton Oilers, New York Islanders and the Vancouver Canucks, Lindgren scored only 54 goals.

A large reason for Lindgren's poor offensive record has been the number of injuries he has suffered.  In 9 seasons playing in North America, Lindgren only played one where he missed no time due to injury.  Back surgery effectively ended his career.  He announced his retirement due to injury on 20 January 2005, despite being only thirty years old.

Lindgren represented Sweden at the 1998 Winter Olympics in Nagano, Japan.

After his professional career ended he moved back to his hometown of Skellefteå, Sweden where he became assistant coach for Skellefteå AIK.

He now does skill development at North Shore Winter Club.

Career statistics

Regular season and playoffs

International

References

External links 

1974 births
Living people
Cape Breton Oilers
Cape Breton Oilers players
Edmonton Oilers players
Färjestad BK players
Hamilton Bulldogs (AHL) players
Manitoba Moose players
National Hockey League first-round draft picks
New York Islanders players
People from Skellefteå Municipality
Skellefteå AIK players
Swedish expatriate ice hockey players in Canada
Swedish expatriate ice hockey players in the United States
Swedish ice hockey centres
Vancouver Canucks players
Winnipeg Jets (1979–1996) draft picks
Olympic ice hockey players of Sweden
Ice hockey players at the 1998 Winter Olympics
Sportspeople from Västerbotten County